Left Hand Drive is a 2000 album by Australian hard rock group The Angels.

Track listing
"Don't Waste My Time"  – 5:14  
"Junk City"  – 6:22 
"Dead Man's Shoes"  – 4:36 
"Back Street Pick Up" (Lipstick Remix)  – 7:24 
"Don't Break Me Down"  – 4:47 
"Tear Me Apart"  – 3:32 
"Straight Aces"  – 4:01
"Blood on the Moon"  – 3:00 
"Take an X"  – 6:37
"Man There"  – 5:04

Liberation release http://www.liberation.com.au/artists/release/Left_Hand_Drive%5B%5D

Personnel
Doc Neeson - lead vocals
Rick Brewster - lead guitar	 	 
John Brewster - rhythm guitar, backing vocals
Jim Hilbun - bass guitar, backing vocals
Brent Eccles - drums

2000 albums
The Angels (Australian band) albums